"Is It Scary" is a song by American singer-songwriter Michael Jackson. The song was originally written to have been featured in the 1993 film Addams Family Values, but the plans were canceled after contract conflicts. The song was later released on Jackson's 1997 remix album Blood on the Dance Floor: HIStory in the Mix. "Is It Scary" was written and produced by Jackson, Jimmy Jam (James Harris III) and Terry Lewis.

"Is It Scary" received mixed reviews from contemporary music critics. Musically, the song was viewed by music critics as showing a "darker side" of Jackson, and compared the song's composition to the music of Marilyn Manson. In November 1997, a radio edit version of the song was released as a promotional single in the Netherlands, while promo singles containing remixes were released in the United States and the United Kingdom.

Background
"Is It Scary" was originally written by Michael Jackson, James Harris III and Terry Lewis for the 1993 film Addams Family Values. Paramount Pictures had signed Jackson to record a horror-themed song for the film (which became "Is It Scary") and to promote it with a video, but the song was dropped from the soundtrack due to contractual difficulties (it is frequently believed that Jackson was dropped due to the child molestation accusations leveled against him in 1993, though Paramount stated this is untrue).

The song was among those considered for inclusion on Jackson's 1995 double album HIStory: Past, Present and Future, Book I, but it was not chosen as it did not complement the other tracks on the album. Jackson subsequently wrote the song into his 1997 short film Ghosts. He reused lyrics from "Is It Scary" for the film's title track, which is also included on his Blood on the Dance Floor album. Jackson, Harris and Lewis were given producing credit for the song on  Blood on the Dance Floor.

A remix of "Is It Scary", called "DJ Greek's Scary Mix", was included on a three-track 'minimax' CD single that was released as part of the Ghosts Deluxe Collector Box Set. Remixes of "Is It Scary" were also included on Jackson's cancelled single "Smile". The radio edit for "Is It Scary" was later included on the third disc of the deluxe edition of Jackson's greatest hits album King of Pop in 2008 in the United Kingdom. "Is It Scary" was also featured on the deluxe edition of King of Pop in France. Samples of "Is It Scary" and "Threatened" (from Jackson's tenth studio album Invincible) are featured in the "Thriller" segment of the concert documentary film, Michael Jackson's This Is It (2009).  Tommy D. also produced a remix of the song, but this mix was never officially released. However, this mix leaked on the internet in November 2010.

Promotion
"Is It Scary" was never lifted as a commercial single, but it was given out to radio stations and dance clubs to promote Blood on the Dance Floor: HIStory in the Mix. Promo CD singles containing a radio edit and 12" promos containing three remixes of the song were released to the Netherlands. The United States and the United Kingdom received 12" promo singles containing remixes of the song by Deep Dish, while the UK also received 12" promos with remixes of the song by Eddie Arroyo known as "Eddie's Love Mixes". Due to lack of a full release, "Is It Scary" did not enter any music charts.

Critical reception
"Is It Scary" received mixed reviews from contemporary music critics. Jim Farber, writer for the New York Daily News, commented that "Is It Scary' boasts a few innovative sounds but no real melodies". Roger Catlin of The Hartford Courant stated that "the most intriguing pairing" was "Ghosts" and "Is It Scary" because Jackson "asks those who've only read about him in tabloids if he seems monstrous". Anthony , a writer for The Buffalo News, remarked that Blood on the Dance Floor: HIStory in the Mixs songs "Superfly Sister", "Ghosts" and "Is It Scary" were "programmed plastic soul that makes you wonder how someone as talented as Jackson can churn out such tracks".

Jae-Ha Kim, a writer for Chicago Sun-Times, noted, that "Is It Scary" shows a "darker side of Jackson than even the tabloids would have you believe". Neil Strauss, a writer for The New York Times, described "Is It Scary" as "sounding more like the ghoulish rocker Marilyn Manson than the Motown prodigy that he is." A longtime commentator on Jackson's public life, J. Randy Taraborrelli, gave a retrospective analysis on Blood on the Dance Floor: HIStory in the Mixs critical reviews in the biography, The Magic & the Madness (2004). Taraborrelli argued that certain sections of the world took interest in tabloid stories about Jackson's personal life over his musical career.

Track listings and formats
Promo CD Single
 "Is It Scary (Radio Edit)" – 4:11
Promo 12" Single
 "Is It Scary (Deep Dish Dark And Scary Remix)" – 12:07
 "Is It Scary (Eddie's Rub-A-Dub Mix)" – 5:00
 "Is It Scary (Eddie's Love Mix)" – 8:00
 "Off the Wall (Junior Vasquez Remix)" – 4:57

Remixes
Eddie Arroyo Mixes
 "Is It Scary (Eddie's Love Mix)" – 8:00
 "Is It Scary (Eddie's Love Mix Radio Edit)" – 3:50
 "Is It Scary (Eddie's Rub-A-Dub Mix)" – 4:33
 "Is It Scary (Downtempo Groove Mix)" – 4:32 
Deep Dish Mixes
 "Is It Scary (Deep Dish Dark & Scary Remix)" – 12:07
 "Is It Scary (Deep Dish Dark & Scary Radio Edit)" – 4:38
 "Is It Scary (Deep Dish Double-O-Jazz Dub)" – 8:35
Chris "The Greek" Panaghi Mix
 "Is It Scary (DJ Greek Scary Remix)" – 7:11
Tommy D Mix
 "Is It Scary (Tommy D's Death Row Mix)" – 4:15

References

Bibliography

1997 singles
1997 songs
Funk rock songs
Songs written for films
Michael Jackson songs
Songs written by Michael Jackson
Song recordings produced by Michael Jackson
American rock songs